The 2017 South American U-20 Championship was an international association football tournament held in Ecuador. The ten national teams involved in the tournament were required to register a squad of 23 players; only players in these squads are eligible to take part in the tournament.

Each player had to have been born after 1 January 1997. All ages as of start of the tournament.

Players name marked in bold have been capped at full international level.

Group A

Brazil
Head coach: Rogério Micale

Chile
Head coach: Héctor Robles

Colombia
Head coach: Carlos Restrepo

Ecuador
Head coach: José Javier Rodríguez Mayorga

Jhon Pereira (11) and Byron Castillo (13) were excluded.

Paraguay
Head coach: Pedro Sarabia

Group B

Argentina
Head coach: Claudio Úbeda

Bolivia
Head coach: Marco Sandy

Peru
Head coach:  Fernando Nogara

Uruguay
Head coach: Fabián Coito

Venezuela
Head coach: Rafael Dudamel

References

South American U-20 Championship squads